O.B. Buchana is an American blues singer and musician.

He was born in Mound Bayou, Mississippi, and grew up in Clarksdale, Mississippi, beginning singing gospel songs from the age of eight.

References

External links

Soulbluesmusic.com

Living people
21st-century African-American male singers
American blues singers
People from Mound Bayou, Mississippi
Year of birth missing (living people)